Laibin (Zhuang: Laizbinh) is a prefecture-level city in the central part of the Guangxi Zhuang Autonomous Region, China.

History
Laibin is an ancient town with more than 2000 years of history. The area was settled in prehistoric times, more than 30,000 years ago.

Geography and climate

Laibin is located in central Guangxi. The Hongshui River or Red River and Rong River, both tributaries of the Xi River, meet in Laibin.

Administration
Laibin administers 1 district, 1 county-level city 3 counties, and 1 autonomous county.

District:
 Xingbin District

County-level city:
 Heshan City

Counties:
 Xincheng County
 Xiangzhou County
 Wuxuan County

Autonomous county:
 Jinxiu Yao Autonomous County

Demographics
Laibin's population is 2,498,236(2010). 69.4% of the people belong to the Zhuang ethnic group. The rest include Han, Yao, and other ethnic groups.

 These figures are based on the following official statistics:

Economy
Laibin is an important transportation hub with several regional and national highways, important rail lines, and shipping along the Hongshui River to Hong Kong, Macau, and Guangzhou. Agriculture is a major industry with sugarcane, rice, peanuts, tea, and fruits being the major crops. There are more than 600 industries in Laibin including sugar processing, powerplants, construction materials, mining, and Chinese medicine. The area produces 1/4 of the world's indium.

Culture
Laibin is filled with numerous examples of unique ethnic minority culture, especially from the Yao. There are also many types of dance found only in the area including the Bamboo Horse, the Colorful Butterfly, the Dragon Fish, the Emerald, the Bright Lantern, and the Yao dance, the Monkey Drum.

Notable people
Xiao Qiaogui (1821–1852) Taiping general.
Zhai Fuwen (1866–1942) educator, author, and national assembly representative for Guangxi province
Liu Ceqi (1895–1927) revolutionary hero and martyr, Zhuang.
Mo Jiangbai (1918–1949) revolutionary hero and martyr, Zhuang.
Zhang Hua (1911–1990) military and political figure.
Jin Baosheng (1927– ) military and political figure, Yao. 
Han Feng (1956– ) Tobacco monopoly apparatchik outed in 2010 as a "Chinese Casanova".
Jing Xianfa (1957– ) Current Mayor of Laibin.

References

External links
Official Website(Chinese)

 
Prefecture-level divisions of Guangxi
Cities in Guangxi